The 1977–78 Michigan State Spartans men's basketball team represented Michigan State University in the 1977–78 NCAA Division I men's basketball season as members of the Big Ten Conference. They played their home games at Jenison Fieldhouse in East Lansing, Michigan and were coached by second-year head coach, Jud Heathcote. MSU finished the season 25–5, 15–3 in Big Ten play to win the Big Ten Championship. They received the conference's automatic bid to the NCAA Tournament where they defeated Providence and Western Kentucky before losing to Kentucky in the Mideast Regional Final. The team was led by freshman Earvin "Magic" Johnson and Gregory Kelser.

Previous season 
The Spartans finished the 1976–77 season with a record of 10–17, 7–11 to finish in fifth place in Big Ten play.

Roster and stats

Source

Schedule and results 

|-
!colspan=9 style=| Non-conference regular season

|-
!colspan=9 style=| Big Ten regular season

|-
!colspan=9 style=|NCAA Tournament

Awards and honors
 Earvin "Magic" Johnson – All-Big Ten First Team

References

Michigan State Spartans men's basketball seasons
Michigan State
Michigan State
Michigan
Michigan